Lioberus castaneus is a species of bivalve mollusc in the family Mytilidae. It can be found along the Atlantic coast of North America, ranging from Florida to the West Indies and Brazil.

References

Mytilidae
Bivalves described in 1822